Manuel Agudo Durán (born 15 October 1986), known as Nolito, is a Spanish professional footballer who plays as a winger or a forward for Segunda División club Ibiza.

Having begun his career at lower league clubs he signed for Barcelona in 2008, playing predominantly with its reserves. He totalled over 160 games and 40 goals in La Liga, where he also represented Granada, Celta and Sevilla. Abroad, he played two seasons for Benfica in Portugal, and one in the English Premier League with Manchester City.

Nolito made his debut for Spain in November 2014, representing the nation at Euro 2016.

Club career

Early career
Born in Sanlúcar de Barrameda, Cádiz, Andalusia, Nolito began his career with UD Algaida in his hometown before joining Atlético Sanluqueño in 2000. He made his first-team debut in Tercera División with the latter club at the age of just 15, scoring on his debut, and moved to Valencia in 2003, where he wrapped up his formative years.

Nolito returned to Sanluqueño in 2005, and was their top scorer in the 2005–06 season with 27 goals (24 in the regular season). He then signed with Écija of the Segunda División B, where he scored in a 1–1 home draw against Real Madrid in the 2006–07 Copa del Rey.

Barcelona
Nolito arrived at Barcelona's youth academy at nearly 22 years of age, after scoring 13 times for Écija the previous campaign. With the Catalans' B team, also in the third tier, he scored 16 league goals over two seasons – 12 in the second– as the side returned to the Segunda División after an 11-year absence.

On 3 October 2010, Nolito made his La Liga debut for Barcelona, coming on as a substitute for Pedro in a 1–1 home draw against Mallorca. On 10 November, he opened the 5–1 home win over Ceuta in the round of 32 of the Copa del Rey (7–1 on aggregate).

Benfica

In late May 2011, Nolito rejected Barcelona's offer of a professional contract and instead signed a five-year deal with Portuguese club Benfica, effective as of 1 July. He scored on his official debut on the 27th, a 2–0 home win against Trabzonspor in the UEFA Champions League third qualifying round. He also netted in the second leg, a 1–1 draw.

On 20 August 2011, Nolito scored once in a 3–1 home victory over Feirense, making him alongside Eusébio the only player to score in his first five official matches. He managed 15 goals in 48 competitive appearances in his first season, helping his team to win the Taça da Liga.

Nolito returned to his country and his native region on 29 January 2013, being loaned to Granada for six months and a fee of €600,000, without the possibility of making the move permanent in June. In his first match, four days after signing, he took the corner which resulted in Cristiano Ronaldo's own goal for the game's only, giving Granada their first win over Real Madrid in 40 years.

Celta

Nolito signed with Celta de Vigo on 1 July 2013, penning a four-year deal and reuniting with former Barcelona B boss Luis Enrique. He finished his debut campaign as team top scorer with 14.

Nolito was named La Liga Player of the Month for September 2014, with four goals during a month which ended with the side in sixth position. He created 96 goalscoring opportunities over the campaign, the most in the Spanish league and fourth most in Europe's five leading leagues.

On 23 September 2015, Nolito took his league tally to five after scoring once and providing two assists for Iago Aspas in a 4–1 home defeat of former club Barcelona. He totalled three goals and an assist that month to help them remain unbeaten, earning him a second Player of the Month accolade. In mid-December, however, he suffered a hamstring injury against Espanyol which sidelined him for two months.

Nolito returned to action on 20 February 2016, featuring roughly 20 minutes in a 3–2 home win over Eibar. In the following round, he scored the game's only goal at Getafe, and Celta eventually finished in sixth place.

Manchester City

On 1 July 2016, Nolito signed with Premier League side Manchester City on a four-year deal for a fee of £13.8 million. He made his debut on 13 August, playing 59 minutes in a 2–1 home victory against Sunderland. Three days later he scored his first goal, and also provided an assist to Sergio Agüero in a 5–0 away rout of Steaua București in the Champions League play-off round.

Nolito made a few appearances during his time in Manchester, but he and his family were unsettled by life in England.

Sevilla
In July 2017, Sevilla signed Nolito on a three-year contract. He spent the better part of 2018–19 on the sidelines, nursing a fibula injury.

Return to Celta
On 18 June 2020, Nolito rejoined Celta on a reported one-year deal. His Sevilla contract was set to expire at the end of the month, and the former were granted an emergency exception to acquire him outside of the transfer window because of a long-term injury to goalkeeper Sergio Álvarez. Three days later, in his first game back, he came off the bench to assist Santi Mina and score a penalty in a 6–0 home thrashing of Alavés.

Ibiza
On 5 September 2022, Nolito joined second-tier Ibiza on a free transfer.

International career
Nolito did not earn a single cap for Spain at youth level. On 7 November 2014, he was called up by full side manager Vicente del Bosque for a UEFA Euro 2016 qualifier against Belarus and a friendly with Germany. He made his debut against the latter on the 18th, starting at his club ground of Balaídos in a 0–1 loss.

On 17 May 2016, Nolito was named in the preliminary squad for the final tournament in France. Twelve days later, in a friendly against Bosnia and Herzegovina, he scored his first goals, striking twice in the first half of a 3–1 win in Switzerland. he repeated the feat the following match, a 6–1 rout of South Korea in Austria.

Selected for the squad of 23, Nolito acted often as starter, scoring from close range in a 3–0 group stage victory over Turkey at the Stade de Nice and also assisting Álvaro Morata for the opener.

Career statistics

Club

International

Scores and results list Spain's goal tally first, score column indicates score after each Nolito goal.

Honours
Barcelona
La Liga: 2010–11

Benfica
Taça da Liga: 2011–12

Sevilla
UEFA Europa League: 2019–20

Individual
La Liga Player of the Month: September 2014, September 2015

Notes

References

External links

1986 births
Living people
People from Sanlúcar de Barrameda
Sportspeople from the Province of Cádiz
Spanish footballers
Footballers from Andalusia
Association football wingers
Association football forwards
La Liga players
Segunda División players
Segunda División B players
Tercera División players
Atlético Sanluqueño CF players
Écija Balompié players
FC Barcelona Atlètic players
FC Barcelona players
Granada CF footballers
RC Celta de Vigo players
Sevilla FC players
UD Ibiza players
Primeira Liga players
S.L. Benfica footballers
Premier League players
Manchester City F.C. players
UEFA Europa League winning players
Spain international footballers
UEFA Euro 2016 players
Spanish expatriate footballers
Expatriate footballers in Portugal
Expatriate footballers in England
Spanish expatriate sportspeople in Portugal
Spanish expatriate sportspeople in England